The Col de la Schlucht (elevation ) is a mountain pass in the Vosges Mountains of France. On the west side lies the historical region of Lorraine (Lothringen in German), on the east side lies the historical region of Alsace (Elsass in German).

The pass takes its name from the German word "Schlucht", meaning "gorge" or "ravine". It connects Munster (Haut-Rhin) with Gérardmer (Vosges) (east–west, via the D417) and is also crossed by the Route des Crêtes (north–south, D61 and D430).

Near the Col, along the Route des Crêtes (D430) is the source of the Meurthe.

The climb over the pass has been used several times in the Tour de France cycle race.

History
Between 1871 and 1918, the pass was a border crossing between Lorraine (France) and Alsace, which had been ceded to Germany under the Treaty of Frankfurt.

Prior to World War I, the pass could be accessed via two separate tramway lines, from Gérardmer (opened 1904) and Munster (opened 1907) respectively. Both lines were abandoned at the outbreak of the war; that from Munster was never re-opened, whereas the line from Gérardmer continued in service until 1940.

Facilities
Winter sports

Col de la Schlucht is reputed to have the first ski-lift in the Vosges and has long been a popular destination for wintersports such as cross-country skiing and alpine skiing. It is also a popular area for snowshoeing.

Hiking

There are many trails marked by Club Vosgien. The most famous is probably the Sentier des Roches, a rocky footpath along the edge of a ridge near the Col which is closed in winter. This is considered to be one of the most impressive (and dangerous) Alsatian mountain paths. It is a part of GR 531 and can be used to go to Hohneck via Frankenthal.

Col de la Schlucht also lies on GR 5 and GRP Tour de la Vologne.

Lifts and luge

The lifts usually keep working in summer. The seats can carry a backpack or even a bicycle, making it possible to go mountain biking (a mountain bike is a VTT in French).

There is a ski-lift up Montabey; from the top of the ski-lift, in summer, there is a luge run back down to the Col.

Details of the climbs
From the west, the climb starts at Le Kertoff,  before Gérardmer. The steepest section is at 6.7%. This was the climb used in the 2009 Tour de France.

The overall average gradient is 4.2%, which is maintained fairly steadily throughout the climb.

The summit can also be accessed via Route des Crêtes from the Col du Bonhomme (north) or the Col du Grand Ballon (south).

Tour de France
The climb over the pass was first used on stage 20 of the 1931 Tour de France, when the summit was crossed by a group of riders, although André Leducq was the first across the line after the descent into Colmar.

Appearances in the Tour de France (since 1947)
Since World War II, the col has been crossed eight times, either as a Category 2 or Category 3 climb.

References

External links
 
Official website 
Tramway de Gérardmer on French Wikipedia 
Tramway de Munster à la Schlucht on French Wikipedia 
Sentier des Roches on German Wikipedia 
Col de la Schlucht on Google Maps (Tour de France classic climbs)

Transport in Grand Est
Mountain passes of Grand Est
Schlucht
Grand Est region articles needing translation from French Wikipedia